St Anthony's Football Club is a Scottish non-league football club based in Glasgow.

History
Founded in 1902, they were members of the Scottish Junior Football Association from that time until 2020 when all local clubs moved to the new West of Scotland Football League, becoming part of the senior football pyramid for the first time.

St Anthony's were originally based in the heart of Govan and then played at two grounds on either side of the Moorepark neighbourhood close to Ibrox Stadium, home of Rangers, until the 1990s; however, the Ants have strong cultural ties to Celtic, having originated via the local branch of the League of the Cross Catholic abstinence society which drew much of its membership from the Irish immigrant community. Since 1999 their home ground is McKenna Park in Shieldhall, directly north of the M8 motorway (the road was built through Cardonald Park and so the ground often referred to as being located in the Cardonald district, although it lies on the other side of the motorway).

The team reached the final of the Scottish Junior Cup on two occasions (1919 and 1925) but never lifted the trophy. They won honours in the Scottish Junior League up to 1922 when they joined the more prestigious Glasgow League, remaining with that group in the subsequent decades through the Intermediate, Central and West Region eras, into the 21st century. They were West of Scotland Junior Cup winners in 1938, but never seriously challenged for major honours after World War II.

Notable former players

The following players all represented Scotland at full international level after stepping up to Senior football direct from St. Anthony's:
 Bobbie Bruce – Aberdeen and Middlesbrough
 Ginger Dunn – Hibernian and Everton; One of the 1928 Wembley Wizards
 Bobby Evans – 535 first-team appearances for Celtic, 48 Scotland caps and inducted to the Scottish Football Hall of Fame in 2008; Also played for Chelsea
 John Gilchrist – Celtic
 Tommy McInally – Celtic
 John Reid McKay – Celtic, Blackburn Rovers and Middlesbrough

The following former St Anthony's players played for clubs in the Scottish Football League and/or English Football League:

Billy Craig – Celtic
John Duffy – Celtic, Arbroath, Southend United
George Ferguson – Celtic
Willie Gallacher – Celtic, Falkirk, Ayr United, St Johnstone
Peter Lamb – Celtic, Alloa Athletic
Matt Lynch – Celtic
John Murphy – Heart of Midlothian, Motherwell, Kilmarnock 
Willie O'Neill – Celtic, Carlisle United
Norman Thomson – Dumbarton, Hibernian and nine English Football League clubs
Johnny Quigley – Nottingham Forest, Huddersfield Town, Bristol City, Mansfield Town

References

External links
 
 Profile at Scottish FA
twitter
 Video clip of match at old ground from 1998

 
Govan
Football clubs in Scotland
Scottish Junior Football Association clubs
Association football clubs established in 1904
Football clubs in Glasgow
1904 establishments in Scotland
West of Scotland Football League teams